Tarreh Bakhakh Pardis (also Romanized as Ţarreh Bakhākh Pardīs; also known as Pardīs, Parpīs, Tare baxâj, Tare-baxxâx, Ţareh, Ţareh Bakhāj, Ţareh Bakhkhākh, Tareh Nejākh, and Tura) is a village in Shalahi Rural District, in the Central District of Abadan County, Khuzestan Province, Iran. At the 2006 census, its population was 2,326, in 490 families.

References 

Populated places in Abadan County